Kendrew Barracks is a British Army barracks located  north east of Cottesmore, Rutland, England. The barracks opened in 2012 on the site of RAF Cottesmore.

History

Kendrew Barracks sits on the former site of RAF Cottesmore which was active between 1938 and 2012 and housed both the Royal Air Force and the United States Army Air Forces during its lifetime. Cottesmore was the home of the Tri-National Tornado Training Establishment which trained Panavia Tornado crews and the last operational home of the British Aerospace Harrier II.

In July 2011 Defence Secretary Liam Fox  announced that Cottesmore would house the Army's East of England Multi-Role Brigade. The Army officially took over the site in April 2012 and Kendrew Barracks was officially opened in October 2012 by the Duke of Gloucester. The new barracks were named after Major General Sir Douglas Kendrew. It is now home to the 2nd Battalion, Royal Anglian Regiment, who moved from Dhekelia Garrison in Cyprus. A second regiment, 7 Regiment, Royal Logistic Corps, moved to the base in June 2013.

In Autumn 2017 2nd Battalion, Princess of Wales's Royal Regiment moved to Kendrew Barracks replacing 2nd Battalion, Royal Anglian Regiment.

As of 1 November 2018, there were 1,127 troops assigned to the units based at the barracks.

Based units 
The following notable units are based at Kendrew Barracks.

British Army 
Infantry (Queen's Division)

 2nd Battalion, Royal Anglian Regiment
 
Royal Logistics Corps (102 Logistic Brigade)

 7 Force Logistics Regiment

References

External links
2nd Battalion RAR
7 Regiment RLC

Installations of the British Army
Buildings and structures in Rutland
Barracks in England
2012 establishments in England